A projection plane, or plane of projection, is a type of view in which graphical projections from an object intersect. Projection planes are used often in descriptive geometry and graphical representation. A picture plane in perspective drawing is a type of projection plane.

With perspective drawing, the lines of sight, or projection lines, between an object and a picture plane return to a vanishing point and are not parallel. With parallel projection the lines of sight from the object to the projection plane are parallel.

See also
Image plane
Picture plane

References 

Graphical projections
Planes (geometry)